Australia is impacted by all forms of major weather events and extremes.

Below is an index of relevant articles.

General

 Extreme weather events in Melbourne

Floods
 Floods in Australia

Queensland
 1893 Brisbane flood
 1974 Brisbane flood
 1998 Townsville floods
 March 2010 Queensland floods
 2010–11 Queensland floods
 2019 Townsville flood

New South Wales
 Floods in New South Wales
 1955 Hunter Valley floods
 1956 Murray River flood
 June 2007 Hunter Region and Central Coast storms
 2011 Wollongong floods

Australian Capital Territory
 1971 Canberra flood

Victoria
 1909 Western Victorian floods
 1956 Murray River flood
 2010 Victorian floods
 Early 2011 Victorian floods

Tasmania
 1929 Tasmanian floods
 June 1947 Tasmanian floods

Northern Territory

South Australia
 1956 Murray River flood

Western Australia
 1900 Western Australian floods
 2010 Gascoyne River flood
 2018 Broome flood

Storms
 Severe storms in Australia

Queensland
 1992 Queensland storms

New South Wales
 June 2007 Hunter Region and Central Coast storms

Australian Capital Territory

Victoria
 2005 Melbourne thunderstorm
 2010 Victorian storms

Tasmania

Northern Territory

South Australia

Western Australia

Tornados and water spouts
 1918 Brighton tornado
 1970 Bulahdelah tornado
 1976 Sandon tornado
 1992 Queensland storms
 1992 Bucca tornado
 2001 Sydney to Hobart Yacht Race waterspout
 2003 Bendigo tornado

Heat waves
 2012-2013 Angry Summer
 Early 2009 southeastern Australia heat wave

Cold snaps

Cyclones and east coast lows
 Australian east coast low

 1897 Darwin cyclone
 Ada
 Alby
 Alessia
 Althea
 Beni
 Chris
 Christine
 Clare
 Debbie
 Emma
 Tropical Low Fletcher
 Fran
 George
 Gillian
 Glenda
 Gwenda
 Herbie
 Ilona
 Inigo
 Ita
 Joan
 John
 Kate
 Kathy
 Kelvin
 Lam
 Larry
 Laurence
 Leonta
 Les
 Lua
 Mahina
 Marcia
 Marcus
 Monica
 Narelle
 Nina
 Orson
 Oswald
 Peter
 Rewa
 Rona
 Rosita
 Rusty
 Sam
 Sigma
 Steve
 Tasha
 Tessi
 Thelma
 Tracy
 Ului
 Vance
 Winston
 Yasi

Rainfall
 1950 Australian rainfall records

Droughts
 Drought in Australia
 Federation Drought
 1911–16 Australian drought
 1979–83 Eastern Australian drought
 2000s Australian drought

Dust storms
 1983 Melbourne dust storm
 2009 Australian dust storm

See also
 List of weather records, for individual weather records
 Climate of Australia
 Severe storm events in Sydney

Weather events in Australia
Weather extremes of Earth
Australia environment-related lists